Changing Times may refer to:

 the former name of Kiplinger's Personal Finance
 Changing Times (Jon Stevens album)
 Changing Times (film), a 2004 French drama film
 Changin' Times, a song by the Scottish hard rock band Nazareth
 The Changin' Times, an American songwriting and performing duo